Robert Campbell Roberts (born 1942) is an American philosopher and distinguished professor emeritus of ethics at Baylor University. Previously he was a professor of philosophy and psychological studies at Wheaton College.

References

External links
Personal website

21st-century American philosophers
Philosophy academics
Living people
Baylor University faculty
1942 births
Wheaton College (Massachusetts) faculty